The Coronado 23, also called the Sailcrafter 23, is an American trailerable sailboat that was designed by William Crealock as cruiser-racer and first built in 1969.

The design was originally marketed by the manufacturer as the Coronado 23, but a new and unrelated design was also introduced as the Coronado 23 in 1974 and replaced the original in production. The 1974 design is now usually referred to as the Coronado 23-2 to differentiate it from the earlier boat.

The Coronado 23 is a development of the Crealock-designed Columbia 22, but with a different deck and coach house roof.

Production
The design was built by Coronado Yachts in the United States between 1969 and 1973, but it is now out of production.

A number of boats were sold as kits for amateur construction, under the name of Sailcrafter Custom Yachts.

Design
The Coronado 23 is a recreational keelboat, built predominantly of fiberglass, with wood trim. It has a masthead sloop rig, a raked stem, a plumb transom, an internally mounted spade-type rudder controlled by a tiller and a fixed fin keel or a stub keel and centerboard.

The boat is normally fitted with a small  outboard motor for docking and maneuvering, located in a centered aft well.

The design has sleeping accommodation for four people, with a double "V"-berth in the bow cabin, a straight settee quarter berth on the starboard side of the main cabin and a drop-down dinette table berth on the port side. The galley is located on the starboard side amidships. The galley is equipped with a recessed stove, an ice box and a double sink. The head is located in the bow cabin, under the "V"-berth.

Variants
Coronado 23
This fin keel model was introduced in 1969 and built until 1973. It displaces  and carries  of cast iron ballast.
Coronado 23 CB
This stub keel and centerboard model was introduced in 1969 and built until 1972. It displaces  and carries  of ballast.

Operational history
In a 2010 review Steve Henkel wrote, "Here is a boat that packs a lot of stuff into a limited space: four
berths, a dinette, head, stove, icebox, and sink. There's also space in the cockpit for an outboard in a well, right at the feet of the helmsman ... For someone on a limited budget, this boat might be
on their short list—or they might choose the almost identical Columbia 22 (with a different deck mold and a less extended bow) ... Best features: The placement of the outboard engine well under the tiller gives the helmsman very good access to the engine controls (although it reduces cockpit space somewhat). Worst features: Her PHRF seems to indicate a performance deficiency versus her comp[etitor]s."

See also
List of sailing boat types

References

External links
Photo of a Coronado 23

Keelboats
1960s sailboat type designs
Sailing yachts
Trailer sailers
Boats designed by W. I. B. Crealock
Sailboat types built by Coronado Yachts